Len Junor (27 April 1914 – 6 April 2005) was an Australian cricketer. He played eight first-class cricket matches for Victoria between 1930 and 1938.

See also
 List of Victoria first-class cricketers

References

External links
 

1914 births
2005 deaths
Australian cricketers
Victoria cricketers
Cricketers from Melbourne